Henry Hird (30 July 1896 – 1974) was an English footballer who played in the Football League for Blackpool, Bury and New Brighton.

References

1896 births
1974 deaths
English footballers
Association football forwards
English Football League players
Leigh Genesis F.C. players
Bury F.C. players
Blackpool F.C. players
New Brighton A.F.C. players
Rossendale United F.C. players
Burscough F.C. players